Promoball Volleyball is an Italian women's volleyball club based in Flero, it played in the Serie A1 and is currently playing in the Serie B2.

Previous names
Due to sponsorship, the club have competed under the following names:
 Promoball Volleyball (1972–2012)
 Sanitars Metalleghe Mazzano (2012–2013)
 Metalleghe Sanitars Montichiari (2013–2016)
 Metalleghe Montichiari (2016–2017)
 Promoball Volleyball (2017–present)

History
The club was founded in 1972 and started competing in the regional leagues before arriving at the national lower leagues in the mid 1990s. Almost a decade later, in 2012 it was promoted to the Serie A2 and in 2014 it reached the country highest division, the Serie A1. The club remained in the Serie A1 until 2017 when it was relegated to Serie A2. Following the loss of its main sponsor (Metalleghe) at the end of the 2016–17 season, the club was unable to financially maintain itself in the professional leagues and declined to enter the Serie A2 in the following season, focussing on youth volleyball at Serie B2 instead.

Team
This was the club's latest professional team, from Season 2016–2017, as of February 2017.

References

External links

 Official website 

Italian women's volleyball clubs
Volleyball clubs established in 1972
1972 establishments in Italy
Province of Brescia
Sport in Lombardy
Serie A1 (women's volleyball) clubs